Catoptria trichostomus is a moth in the family Crambidae. It was described by Hugo Theodor Christoph in 1858. It is found in North America, where it has been recorded from Alaska to Labrador and Baffin Island in the Northwest Territories, south in the Rocky Mountains to southern Alberta. It is also found in the Russian Far East. The habitat consists of coniferous forests.

The wingspan is 17–20 mm. The forewings are dark brown with a blackish median band followed by a whitish band. The hindwings are brown.

References

Crambini
Moths described in 1858
Moths of Asia
Moths of North America